Sofía Arreola Navarro (born 22 April 1991) is a Mexican track and road cyclist, who currently rides for UCI Women's Team . She represented her nation at the 2010 UCI Road World Championships. She competed in the points race event at the 2010 UCI Track Cycling World Championships. At the 2013 UCI Track Cycling World Championships she won the silver medal in the scratch event and also in the points race.

Career results
2010
 2nd Scratch, Pan American Track Championships
2011
 2nd Omnium, Pan American Games
2013
 UCI Track World Championships
2nd Scratch
2nd Points race
3rd Points race, 6 giorni delle rose – Fiorenzuola (Under-23)
2014
Copa Internacional de Pista
1st Individual pursuit
1st Omnium
1st Scratch
3rd Points race
Grand Prix of Colorado Spring
3rd Omnium
3rd Points race
2015
3rd  Team pursuit, Pan American Games (with Mayra del Rocio Rocha, Íngrid Drexel and Yareli Salazar)
3rd Points race, Independence Day Grand Prix
2016
2nd  Team pursuit, Pan American Track Championships (with Jesica Bonilla, Mayra Del Rocio Rocha and Yareli Salazar)
2018
3rd Points race, International Belgian Track Meeting

References

External links
 
 

1991 births
Mexican female cyclists
Sportspeople from Monterrey
Living people
Cyclists at the 2011 Pan American Games
Cyclists at the 2015 Pan American Games
Cyclists at the 2019 Pan American Games
Mexican track cyclists
Pan American Games medalists in cycling
Pan American Games silver medalists for Mexico
Pan American Games bronze medalists for Mexico
Medalists at the 2011 Pan American Games
Medalists at the 2015 Pan American Games
20th-century Mexican women
21st-century Mexican women
Competitors at the 2010 Central American and Caribbean Games
Competitors at the 2018 Central American and Caribbean Games